Tanya Elizabeth Froehlich is an American pediatrician. She is an associate professor of developmental and behavioral pediatrics at the University of Cincinnati and Cincinnati Children's Hospital Medical Center. Froehlich's research focus is to help doctors properly prescribe ADHD medication for children and focus on how marginalized and disadvantaged youth deal with ADHD compared to their wealthier companions.

Early life and education
Originally from northwestern Pennsylvania, Froehlich earned her medical degree from Yale University School of Medicine. She graduated from Yale with the New England Pediatric Society Prize and was placed at the Children's Hospital of Philadelphia for her residency. Upon completing her residency, she accepted a fellowship at the Cincinnati Children's Hospital Medical Center and earned her Master's degree at the affiliated institute, the University of Cincinnati. Her thesis was published in 2007 and titled ADHD-related Executive Functions: Interactions of a DRD4 Polymorphism, Lead, and Sex.

Career
Upon earning her master's degree, Froehlich became a physician at the medical center and continued to focus on developmental and behavioral pediatrics. In September 2007, she led a study that found that 8.7 percent of children in the United States have no been diagnosed or medically treated for ADHD despite meeting the medically accepted definition. It was also realized that children who lacked health insurance were less likely to be diagnosed or receive consistent treatment. To reach this conclusion, she collected data from the National Health and Nutrition Examination Survey and based their ADHD criteria on the Diagnostic and Statistical Manual for Mental Disorders, Fourth Edition. As a result, she received the 2008 Child Health Research Career Development Award. Two years later, Froehlich published a study in the journal Pediatrics that found a direct link between exposure to lead and tobacco smoke and ADHD. Her research team found that eliminating environmental exposure to lead and tobacco smoke could lead to a reduction in ADHD cases in children between the ages of eight and 15.

Building off of her previous research, Froehlich began to study ways to help doctors properly prescribe ADHD medication for children. In 2010, she led the first-ever placebo-controlled pharmacogenetic drug trial for ADHD in school-age children (between the ages of 7 and 11) to evaluate variants of the DRD4 dopamine receptor gene using teacher ratings of children's symptoms. The following year, she published a study which concluded that children with specific variants of the dopamine transporter (DAT) and dopamine receptor D4 (DRD4) genes reacted more positively to methylphenidate. Beyond examining environmental factors, Froehlich also focused on how marginalized and disadvantaged youth dealt with ADHD compared to their wealthier companions. In 2013, she led a study which found that psychotropic drug prescriptions for preschoolers were highest amongst boys, white children, and those without private insurance.

Froehlich was later influential in the establishment of new guidelines for the standard care for children and teens with complex ADHD symptoms, which was published in the Journal of Developmental and Behavioral Pediatrics. When speaking of the new guidelines, she said "unlike the American Academy of Pediatrics ADHD Clinical Practice Guideline, which focuses on more straightforward cases of ADHD, the SDBP guideline focuses on the care of children with ADHD who have complicating coexisting developmental and mental health disorders such as autism spectrum disorders, learning disorders, anxiety, and depression. As such, the SDBP Complex ADHD guideline addresses a long neglected clinical care gap and provides a valuable new resource for pediatric health care providers." She also helped establish a free range of quality improvement technology to help pediatricians, parents and educators improve the quality of care for those with ADHD.

References

Living people
Yale School of Medicine alumni
University of Cincinnati faculty
Attention deficit hyperactivity disorder researchers
Academics from Pennsylvania
American pediatricians
Women pediatricians
American child psychiatrists
Year of birth missing (living people)